2001 Empress's Cup Final was the 23rd final of the Empress's Cup competition. The final was played at National Stadium in Tokyo on January 20, 2002. Iga FC Kunoichi won the championship.

Overview
Iga FC Kunoichi won their 3rd title, by defeating Tasaki Perule FC 2–1.

Match details

See also
2001 Empress's Cup

References

Empress's Cup
2001 in Japanese women's football